Ibrahim El Kadiri (born 23 January 2002) is a Dutch professional footballer of Moroccan descent who plays as a  left winger for Eredivisie side FC Volendam.

Career
El Kadiri played youth football for AFC IJburg, WV-HEDW, Ajax and FC Utrecht. In 2019, he signed a three-year contract with FC Volendam together with Samir Ben Sallam. He made his debut for Volendam on 29 November 2019, in a 3–1 home win over NEC Nijmegen. He came on as a substitute for Derry Murkin in the 76th minute, and even scored in injury time to secure his first ever professional goal.

On 7 August 2020, he signed a contract extension with Volendam until 2024.

Career statistics

References

External links

2002 births
Living people
Footballers from Amsterdam
Dutch footballers
Association football forwards
AFC Ajax players
FC Utrecht players
FC Volendam players
Eerste Divisie players
Tweede Divisie players
Dutch sportspeople of Moroccan descent